The 1919 Liège–Bastogne–Liège was the ninth edition of the Liège–Bastogne–Liège cycle race and was held on 28 September 1919. The race started and finished in Liège. The race was won by Léon Devos.

General classification

References

1919
1919 in Belgian sport